The 2019 Fastlane was the fifth Fastlane professional wrestling pay-per-view and livestreaming event produced by WWE. It was held for wrestlers from the promotion's Raw and SmackDown brand divisions. The event took place on March 10, 2019, at the Quicken Loans Arena in Cleveland, Ohio. An event was not held in 2020 due to the scheduling of that year's Super ShowDown event, but Fastlane returned in 2021.

Ten matches were contested at the event, including one match on the Kickoff pre-show. In the main event, The Shield (Dean Ambrose, Seth Rollins, and Roman Reigns) defeated Baron Corbin, Bobby Lashley, and Drew McIntyre in a six-man tag team match that was promoted as The Shield's final match together. Other prominent matches included Becky Lynch defeating Charlotte Flair by disqualification, adding her back into the Raw Women's Championship match at WrestleMania 35, and Daniel Bryan retained SmackDown's WWE Championship by defeating Kevin Owens and Mustafa Ali in a triple threat match.

Production

Background
Fastlane is a pay-per-view (PPV) and WWE Network event first produced by WWE in 2015. The name of the event is a reference to its position on the "Road to WrestleMania," being held in the two-month period between the Royal Rumble and WWE's flagship event; the first two Fastlane events were held in February before moving to March. While the 2018 event was a SmackDown-exclusive event, WWE discontinued brand-exclusive pay-per-views following WrestleMania 34 that year, and the 2019 Fastlane in turn featured wrestlers from both the Raw and SmackDown brands. The fifth event in the Fastlane chronology, the 2019 event was held on March 10 at the Quicken Loans Arena in Cleveland, Ohio.

Storylines

The card comprised ten matches, including one on the Kickoff pre-show. The matches resulted from scripted storylines, where wrestlers portrayed heroes, villains, or less distinguishable characters in scripted events that built tension and culminated in a wrestling match or series of matches. Results were predetermined by WWE's writers on the Raw and SmackDown brands, with storylines produced on their weekly television shows, Monday Night Raw and SmackDown Live.

At Elimination Chamber, The Usos (Jey Uso and Jimmy Uso) defeated The Miz and Shane McMahon to win the SmackDown Tag Team Championship. On the following episode of SmackDown, The Miz, who had been pinned, apologized to Shane for costing them the match and begged Shane to schedule a rematch. The Usos interrupted and insulted Miz, after which, Shane scheduled a rematch for the titles at Fastlane.

On the February 12 episode of SmackDown, The New Day's Kofi Kingston was a last-minute replacement for an injured Mustafa Ali in a gauntlet match to determine who would enter the WWE Championship Elimination Chamber match last; Kingston pinned WWE Champion Daniel Bryan and lasted over an hour before being eliminated. At Elimination Chamber, Bryan retained the title in the titular match, with Kingston being the last wrestler eliminated. On the following episode of SmackDown, Kingston was granted a WWE Championship match at Fastlane after pinning Bryan in a six-man tag team match that featured Kingston, AJ Styles, and Jeff Hardy against Bryan, Samoa Joe, and Randy Orton. The following week, however, WWE Chairman Vince McMahon interrupted the contract signing between Bryan and Kingston. Although Vince praised Kingston, he replaced him with a returning Kevin Owens, stating that Owens was more qualified and more deserving of the opportunity.

At Elimination Chamber, The Boss 'n' Hug Connection (Bayley and Sasha Banks) defeated Sonya Deville and Mandy Rose, The Riott Squad (represented by Liv Morgan and Sarah Logan), The IIconics (Billie Kay and Peyton Royce), Naomi and Carmella, and Nia Jax and Tamina in a tag team Elimination Chamber match to become the inaugural holders of the WWE Women's Tag Team Championship. The following night on Raw, their championship celebration was interrupted by Jax and Tamina, and Jax taunted Banks about not being able to retain a championship in her title defenses. The following week, The Boss 'n' Hug Connection were scheduled to defend the titles against Jax and Tamina at Fastlane.

On the February 19 episode of SmackDown, during a backstage segment, SmackDown Women's Champion Asuka was interrupted by Sonya Deville and Mandy Rose. Rose challenged Asuka to a non-title match and defeated her after Rose feigned an eye injury. The following week, Rose was granted a championship match against Asuka at Fastlane.

At the Royal Rumble, Becky Lynch was unsuccessful in regaining the SmackDown Women's Championship, but later entered the women's Royal Rumble match and won by last eliminating Charlotte Flair, despite injuring her own knee. The next night on Raw, Lynch confronted Raw Women's Champion Ronda Rousey and chose to face her at WrestleMania 35. Lynch then refused a medical examination on her knee after a brawl with Flair on SmackDown. Stephanie McMahon gave Lynch an ultimatum: have her knee examined or be suspended until she does. Lynch still refused and attacked both Stephanie and Triple H. The following Raw, it was revealed that Lynch had been medically cleared; after she apologized for the attacks, the suspension was lifted, however, Vince McMahon overruled Triple H and Stephanie by suspending Lynch for 60 days and replaced her with Flair as Rousey's WrestleMania opponent. On the February 25 episode of Raw, Lynch was arrested after attacking Rousey; Rousey then demanded that Lynch be reinstated and left the championship in the ring. The following week, Stephanie declared the title vacant, reinstated Lynch, and scheduled a match between her and Flair for the championship at Fastlane. Later on, however, Rousey protested that she did not vacate the title and was only trying to send a message, prompting Stephanie to hand her back the title belt and change the stipulation of the Fastlane match: if Lynch won, she would be added back into the championship match at WrestleMania to make it a triple threat match.

On the October 22, 2018 episode of Raw, Roman Reigns went on hiatus due to leukemia and subsequently vacated the Universal Championship. Later that same night, Dean Ambrose turned on Seth Rollins, feeling that the trio's stable, The Shield, had made him weak. Rollins and Ambrose then fought over the next couple of months, with their feud culminating at TLC: Tables, Ladders & Chairs, where Ambrose defeated Rollins. Reigns returned on the February 25, 2019 episode of Raw and explained that his leukemia was in remission and that he would return to action. The following week, Reigns called out Rollins, wanting to reunite The Shield one more time. Rollins reluctantly agreed since it meant having to team with Ambrose again. Later, after Ambrose was defeated by Elias, Reigns and Rollins came out, but Ambrose exited through the crowd. Baron Corbin, Drew McIntyre, and Bobby Lashley then ambushed Reigns and Rollins, after which, Ambrose returned and aided his former Shield brothers. After gaining the upper hand, Ambrose joined Reigns and Rollins for the signature Shield fist bump and a six-man tag team match pitting the reunited Shield against Corbin, McIntyre, and Lashley was scheduled for Fastlane.

On the February 11 episode of Raw, The Revival (Dash Wilder and Scott Dawson) defeated Bobby Roode and Chad Gable to win the Raw Tag Team Championship. The following week, NXT call-ups Aleister Black and Ricochet made their main roster debuts, and then defeated The Revival in a non-title match on the February 25 episode. On the March 4 episode, Black and Ricochet were granted a Raw Tag Team Championship match against The Revival, but it ended in disqualification after Roode and Gable attacked The Revival. A triple threat tag team championship match between the three teams was then scheduled for Fastlane.

After several weeks of feuding, a match between Andrade and Rey Mysterio was scheduled for the Fastlane Kickoff pre-show.

On March 8, a tag team match between The New Day (represented by Big E and Xavier Woods) and Rusev and Shinsuke Nakamura was scheduled for the Fastlane Kickoff pre-show.

Event

Pre-show 
Backstage during the Fastlane Kickoff pre-show, R-Truth's manager Carmella was attempting to get people to sign a petition so that Truth could have a rematch for the United States Championship, as Truth had lost the title on the previous episode of SmackDown in a fatal four-way match to Samoa Joe, which also involved Andrade and Rey Mysterio. Joe interrupted and said that he had no problem facing any of them. It was then announced that Joe would defend the United States Championship in a fatal four-way match against Truth, Andrade, and Mysterio on the main show, subsequently canceling the pre-show match between Andrade and Mysterio.

Also during the pre-show, Kofi Kingston was told that Vince McMahon had wanted to see him in regard to the WWE Championship match on the main card.

In what then became the only match on the pre-show, The New Day (represented by Big E and Xavier Woods) faced Rusev and Shinsuke Nakamura. In the end, Big E and Woods performed the "Midnight Hour" on Rusev to win the match.

Preliminary matches 

The actual pay-per-view opened with The Usos (Jey Uso and Jimmy Uso) defending the SmackDown Tag Team Championship against The Miz and Shane McMahon. The climax saw Miz perform a frog splash on Jey. However, Jey countered into a roll-up on Miz to retain the titles. After the match, a disappointed Miz and Shane hugged Miz's father, who was in the front row. After Shane consoled Miz and his father, Shane then attacked Miz from behind, turning heel.

Next, Asuka defended the SmackDown Women's Championship against Mandy Rose, who was accompanied by Sonya Deville. In the end, Rose tripped on the ring apron, which Deville had moved prior to obtaining a kendo stick, allowing Asuka to perform a kick to the face on Rose to retain the title.

After that, The New Day's Kofi Kingston came out for what he thought was a triple threat match for the WWE Championship, after Vince McMahon agreed to put Kingston in the WWE Championship match with Big E and Xavier Woods banned from ringside. However, Kingston ended up facing The Bar (Cesaro and Sheamus) in a 2-on-1 handicap match, in which both Cesaro and Sheamus could be in the ring at the same time. After The Bar continued to dominate Kingston, Big E and Woods came out to assist Kingston, only to get intercepted by Shinsuke Nakamura and Rusev. In the climax, The Bar performed a double "White Noise" on Kingston to win the match.

In the fourth match, The Revival (Scott Dawson and Dash Wilder) defended the Raw Tag Team Championship in a triple threat tag team match against the teams of Bobby Roode and Chad Gable, and Aleister Black and Ricochet. In the end, The Revival performed "Shatter Machine" on Gable to retain the titles. After the match, Roode, Black, and Ricochet attacked The Revival, with Ricochet and Black performing their respective finishers on them.

Next, Samoa Joe defended the United States Championship in a fatal four-way match against R-Truth (accompanied by Carmella), Andrade (accompanied by Zelina Vega), and Rey Mysterio. In the end, Joe applied the "Coquina Clutch" on Mysterio, who passed out, thus Joe retained the title.

After that, The Boss 'n' Hug Connection (Bayley and Sasha Banks) defended the WWE Women's Tag Team Championship against Nia Jax and Tamina. In the climax, Bayley performed a hurricanrana on Jax to retain the titles. After the match, Jax and Tamina attacked Banks and Bayley. Beth Phoenix, who was on commentary, came to their aid, but was attacked by Jax and Tamina. Natalya then came out to assist, but was also overpowered by Jax and Tamina.

Next was the triple threat match for the WWE Championship that Vince McMahon announced earlier. After Kevin Owens and WWE Champion Daniel Bryan (accompanied by Rowan) made their entrances, Mustafa Ali was then revealed as the third participant. In the end, Bryan performed a running knee on Ali to retain the title. After the match, Rowan performed a chokeslam on Ali.

In the penultimate match, Becky Lynch faced Charlotte Flair with the stipulation that if Lynch won, she would be added back into the Raw Women's Championship match at WrestleMania 35 to make that match a triple threat match. Lynch showed up with crutches and during the match, Flair focused on Lynch's injured knee. In the end, as Flair applied the "Figure-Eight Leglock", Raw Women's Champion Ronda Rousey came out and attacked Lynch, thus causing Lynch to win by disqualification. Due to Lynch winning, she was added to the Raw Women's Championship match at WrestleMania 35.

In a small filler segment, Elias appeared to sing to the crowd, but was interrupted by Lacey Evans, who walked down the ramp and then exited. Randy Orton then surprise attacked the distracted Elias with an "RKO". AJ Styles then appeared and performed a "Phenomenal Forearm" on Orton.

Main event

In the main event, The Shield (Dean Ambrose, Roman Reigns, and Seth Rollins) faced Baron Corbin, Drew McIntyre, and Bobby Lashley in a six-man tag team match. In the end, The Shield performed a triple powerbomb on McIntyre through an announce table and then another triple powerbomb on Corbin for the win. Afterwards, the three hugged in the ring and did their signature fistbump to end the event.

Aftermath
The 2019 Fastlane event was the final Fastlane to occur until the 2021 event. In 2020, Fastlane was removed from the schedule to allow WWE to hold that year's Super ShowDown PPV.

Raw
The following night on Raw, The Shield opened the show. Roman Reigns stated that if Fastlane was The Shield's final match together, he had no regrets. Reigns then thanked Dean Ambrose and Seth Rollins, after which, Rollins turned his attention to his WrestleMania 35 match against Universal Champion Brock Lesnar. After Lesnar's advocate Paul Heyman came out, Rollins was attacked from behind by Shelton Benjamin, one of Lesnar's old friends. The two then had a match that Rollins won. Reigns later was scheduled to have his first singles match on Raw in five months and against Baron Corbin, but was attacked by Drew McIntyre. Rollins and Ambrose came to assist Reigns. Ambrose then faced McIntyre in a falls count anywhere match in a losing effort.

Raw Women's Champion Ronda Rousey said she interfered in Becky Lynch and Charlotte Flair's match to embarrass and expose them both. She said that both were a joke and could defeat both in a handicap match. Rousey was interrupted by Dana Brooke, however, Rousey attacked Brooke with the Piper's Pit.

Aleister Black and Ricochet then faced and defeated Bobby Roode and Chad Gable. Afterwards, The Revival attacked Black and Ricochet from behind.

Natalya, accompanied by Beth Phoenix, faced Nia Jax, accompanied by Tamina. The match ended in disqualification after Phoenix attacked Jax. After the match backstage, The Boss 'n' Hug Connection (Bayley and Sasha Banks) attacked Jax and Tamina.

SmackDown
On the following episode of SmackDown, The New Day (Big E, Kofi Kingston, and Xavier Woods) confronted Vince McMahon and Kingston asked what he had to do to get a WWE Championship match. Mr. McMahon stated that Kingston was not championship material, but if he could defeat Randy Orton, Samoa Joe, Cesaro, Sheamus, and Rowan in a gauntlet match the following week, he would receive a WWE Championship match against Daniel Bryan at WrestleMania 35.

Shane McMahon addressed his attack on The Miz. He said that he was tired of being used and that he enjoyed beating up Miz and wanted to do it again at WrestleMania 35. He then scheduled a match between himself and Miz for WrestleMania 35.

Randy Orton compared his WWE career to that of AJ Styles' career on the indies, including Styles' time in Ring of Honor and TNA. After further insults between the two, Styles challenged Orton to a match at WrestleMania 35.

Sonya Deville faced Asuka in a non-title match. A similar incident occurred with the ring apron, but this time with Mandy Rose causing Deville to trip on it, causing her to lose the match.

Becky Lynch claimed that she had used mind games on Ronda Rousey, essentially tricking her into getting Lynch back into the WrestleMania match. Charlotte Flair then came out and claimed that neither Lynch or Rousey would be relevant without her and that she was "Ms. WrestleMania".

Samoa Joe and Andrade teamed up to face R-Truth and Rey Mysterio in which Mysterio pinned Joe. Joe then attacked Truth after the match.

Daniel Bryan teamed up with Erick Rowan to take on Mustafa Ali and Kevin Owens in a winning effort.

Results

References

External links
 

2019
2019 WWE Network events
2019 WWE pay-per-view events
2019 in Ohio
March 2019 events in the United States
Events in Cleveland